Tweety family member 2 is a protein that in humans is encoded by the TTYH2 gene. Members of this family function as chloride channels. The encoded protein functions as a calcium(2+)-activated large conductance chloride(-) channel, and may play a role in kidney tumorigenesis. Two transcript variants encoding distinct isoforms have been identified for this gene.

References

Further reading